The following page lists the highest-grossing superhero films of all time, the highest-grossing superheroes at the box office, and the biggest opening weekends for superhero films. The figures have not been adjusted for inflation.

Highest-grossing superhero films

The top six highest-grossing superhero films and eight out of the top ten highest-grossing superhero films have been produced by Marvel Studios, within the Marvel Cinematic Universe (MCU). Avengers: Infinity War and Avengers: Endgame are the only two superhero films to surpass a $2 billion worldwide gross, with Avengers: Endgame having been the highest-grossing film of all time. Most of the films on this list are from either Marvel or DC Comics.

Highest-grossing superhero film franchises and series

This is a list of the highest-grossing superhero film series at the box office. The Marvel Cinematic Universe ranks as the highest-grossing film series of all time. The Incredibles ranks as the ninth highest-grossing animated franchise. A series must have at least two released films to qualify for this list.

Highest-grossing opening weekends 
This list charts films the 50 biggest worldwide openings. Since films do not open on Fridays in many markets, the 'opening' is taken to be the gross between the first day of release and the first Sunday following the movie's release. Figures prior to the year 2002 are not available.

Since many American films do not open in all markets at the same time, the 'opening' gross varies depending on when it was released in the US-Canada market. For example, for films like Captain Marvel and Batman v Superman: Dawn of Justice which opened in the US-Canada market and in most other major markets during the same weekend, the 'opening' is the total gross of the film during that weekend. On the other hand, for films like Avengers: Age of Ultron and Captain America: Civil War which opened in several markets a week ahead of their respective releases in the US-Canada market, the 'opening' is the sum of the opening grosses in the markets where they were released first and the opening in the US-Canada market. In the latter case, the opening grosses from territories after the initial overseas opening are not included in the 'opening' of the film. In all cases, if a film opens in a market after its release in the US-Canada market, that opening is not included in the 'opening' of the film.

Timeline of gross records

Highest-grossing superhero films
At least seventeen films since 1964 have held the record for highest-grossing superhero film. Spider-Man has held the record twice, Batman and the Avengers have held it three times each, and Godzilla held it at least six times. Films based on DC Comics have held the record four times, films based on Marvel Comics have held it five times, and Toho films held it at least six times.

Highest-grossing opening weekends
Fifteen films since 1965 have held the record for highest-grossing worldwide opening weekend for a superhero film. Seven of the films are based on Marvel Comics, while six films are based on DC Comics. Batman has held the record four times, while Superman, Spider-Man and the Avengers have held the record three times each.

Highest-grossing superhero films by year
The following is a list of the highest-grossing superhero film by year since 1966. Some years have no superhero films. Batman has topped six years, while Godzilla has topped twelve years, the most of any superhero. The Marvel Cinematic Universe has topped thirteen years (every year of the 2010s, 2021, 2022 and 2023), while the Godzilla films have topped thirteen  years (mostly during the 1960s–1970s), the most for a franchise. Films based on Marvel Comics have topped eighteen years, the most for a source.

Superhero films by tickets sold

Films must sell at least 50 million tickets to be listed. The Marvel Cinematic Universe contains the most entries on the list, with four films in total. The Avengers series is next, with three films on the list. In total, six of the films below are based on the Marvel Comics.

See also
 Lists of highest-grossing films
 List of highest-grossing films
 List of highest-grossing media franchises
 Blockbuster mentality
 List of American superhero films

Notes

References

Superhero
Superhero films